The Assistant Secretary of State for Oceans and International Environmental and Scientific Affairs is the head of the Bureau of Oceans and International Environmental and Scientific Affairs in the United States Department of State.  The Assistant Secretary of State for Oceans and International Environmental and Scientific Affairs reports to the Under Secretary of State for Economic Growth, Energy, and the Environment.  President Donald Trump appointed Andrew Lawler to the post as Acting Assistant Secretary and nominated him to the Senate-confirmed post on September 8, 2020. His nomination was returned to the President by the United States Senate on January 3, 2021. President Joe Biden nominated Monica Medina as Assistant Secretary on April 27, 2021. Medina was confirmed by the Senate on September 28, 2021, by a vote of 61–36.

The goal of the agency is to "advance America's security and prosperity through international leadership on oceans, environment, science, space, and health".

Assistant Secretaries of State for Oceans and International Environmental and Scientific Affairs, 1975—present

Senior Bureau Official for the Bureau of Oceans and International Environmental and Scientific Affairs, 2014—2021

Notes and references

 
1975 establishments in the United States
Environmental policy in the United States
Health policy in the United States
Lists of office-holders in the United States
United States and the Antarctic